The area now known as Kom El Sultan is located near Abydos, in Egypt. It is a big mudbrick structure, the purpose of which is not clear and thought to have been at the original settlement area, dated to the Early Dynastic Period. The structure includes the early temple of Osiris, which was probably built on the location of the temple to the earlier local deity Khenti-Amentiu. Much of the original settlement is now lost under modern construction and cultivation but excavations have revealed hundreds of stelae which have yielded a good deal of information about the cult of Osiris. A beaten path still leads from Kom El Sultan to Umm El Qa'ab, showing the way pilgrims took in the past.

The only known statue of Khufu was found here and recently a portal temple to Ramesses II has been excavated here.

Abydos, Egypt sites
Ramesses II
Khufu